John Paget (18 April 1808 – 10 April 1892), Paget János in Hungarian, was an English agriculturist and author on Hungary.

Life and works
Paget was born in Loughborough. He was educated at the Unitarian Manchester College at York, and then read medicine. He travelled extensively in Europe. He married the Hungarian Baroness Polyxena Wesselenyi Banffy (née de Hadad), divorced wife of Baron Ladislaus Banffy, on 15 November 1836. He lived on his wife's estate in Transylvania, developing the farming there with an "improved" breed of cow, and campaigning for improvements to agriculture. His diary, in six volumes, was in Hungary's National Museum (and today it is in the National Széchényi Library in Budapest). Volumes 1-5 contain observations on natural history around Europe. Volume 6 records Hungary's 1849 war of independence, in which Paget took part.

He is known for his 1839 book Hungary and Transylvania.

In 1878 after the World Exhibition in Paris he was given the cross of the Legion of Honour.
 
He died in Ghiriş (then called Gyéres) and is buried in the Hajongard Cemetery in Cluj-Napoca, Romania.

References

1808 births
1892 deaths
English agronomists
English writers
British emigrants to Austria-Hungary